Haplogroup L-M20 is a human Y-DNA haplogroup, which is defined by SNPs M11, M20, M61 and M185. As a secondary descendant of haplogroup K and a primary branch of haplogroup LT, haplogroup L currently has the alternative phylogenetic name of  K1a, and is a sibling of haplogroup T (a.k.a. K1b).

The presence of L-M20 has been observed at varying levels throughout South Asia, peaking in populations native to Balochistan (28%), and Southern India (19%), where as its peak level up to 68% is observed in Korova Tribes or Koraga people of coastal Karnataka and north Kerala. The clade also occurs in Afghanistan,Tajikistan and Anatolia, as well as at lower frequencies in Iran.  It has also been present for millennia at very low levels in the Caucasus, Europe and Central Asia. The subclade L2 (L-L595) has been found in Europe and Western Asia, but is extremely rare.

Phylogenetic tree
There are several confirmed and proposed phylogenetic trees available for haplogroup L-M20. The scientifically accepted one is the Y-Chromosome Consortium (YCC) one published in Karafet 2008 and subsequently updated. A draft tree that shows emerging science is provided by Thomas Krahn at the Genomic Research Center in Houston, Texas. The International Society of Genetic Genealogy (ISOGG) also provides an amateur tree.

This is Thomas Krahn at the Genomic Research Center's Draft tree Proposed Tree for haplogroup L-M20:
 L-M20 M11, M20, M61, M185, L656, L863, L878, L879
 L-M22 (L1) M22, M295, PAGES00121
 L-M317 (L1b) M317, L655
 L-M349 (L1b1) M349
 L-M274 M274
 L-L1310 L1310
 L-L1304 L1304
 L-M27 (L1a1) M27, M76, P329.1, L1318, L1319, L1320, L1321
 L-M357 (L1a2) M357, L1307
 L-PK3 PK3
 L-L1305 L1305, L1306, L1307
 L-L595 (L2) L595
 L-L864 L864, L865, L866, L867, L868, L869, L870, L877

Origins
L-M20 is a descendant of Haplogroup LT,<ref>[http://www.isogg.org/tree/ISOGG_YDNATreeTrunk.html International Society of Genetic Genealogy, 2015, Y-DNA Haplogroup Tree 2015] (30 May 2015).</ref> which is a descendant of haplogroup K-M9. According to Dr. Spencer Wells, L-M20 was hypothesized to have originated in India ca. 30,000 years ago. Other studies have proposed a West Asian origin for L-M20 and associated its expansion with the Indus Valley civilisation and neolithic farmers. McElreavy and Quintana-Murci, writing on the Indus Valley civilisation, state that

Sengupta et al. (2006) observed three subbranches of haplogroup L: L1-M76 (L1a1), L2-M317 (L1b) and L3-M357 (L1a2), with distinctive geographic affiliations. Almost all Indian members of haplogroup L are L1 derived, with L3-M357 occurring only sporadically (0.4%). Conversely in Pakistan, L3-M357 subclade account for 86% of L-M20 chromosomes and reaches an intermediate frequency of 6.8%, overall. L1-M76 occurs at a frequency of 7.5% in India and 5.1% in Pakistan, exhibiting peak variance distribution in the Maharashtra region in coastal western India.

A 2022 paper by Tariq et al., concluded that haplogroup L originated in South Asian among indigenous hunter-gatherers somewhere in Northwest India. These hunter-gatherers contributed to the formation of the Indus Valley civilisation, next to Iranian-related farmers, which arrived in Northwest India ~10ky ago, and that haplogroup L later spread westwards into Iran and other regions of the Middle East.

Geographical distribution
In India, L-M20 has a higher frequency among Dravidian castes, but is somewhat rarer in Indo-Aryan castes. In Pakistan, it has highest frequency in Balochistan.

It has also been found at low frequencies among populations of Central Asia and South West Asia (including Arabia, Iraq, Syria, Turkey, Lebanon, Egypt, and Yemen) as well as in Southern Europe (especially areas adjoining the Mediterranean Sea).

Preliminary evidence gleaned from non-scientific sources, such as individuals who have had their Y-chromosomes tested by commercial labs, suggests that most European examples of Haplogroup L-M20 might belong to the subclade L2-M317, which is, among South Asian populations, generally the rarest of the subclades of Haplogroup L.

South Asia

India
It has higher frequency among Dravidian castes (ca. 17-19%) but is somewhat rarer in Indo-Aryan castes (ca. 5-6%). It reaches up to 68% in Korova Tribes or Koraga people and coastal Karnataka and north Kerala, 38% in some castes in Gujarat, and an overall frequency of 12% in Punjab. The presence of haplogroup L-M20 is rare among tribal groups (ca. 5,6-7%) (and ).

L-M20 was found 68% in the Korova Tribes or Koraga people from Karnataka, 38% in the Bharwad caste from Junagarh district in Gujarat, 21% in Charan caste from Junagarh district in Gujarat and 17% in the Kare Vokkal tribe from Uttara Kannada in Karnataka. Also found at low frequency in other populations from Junagarh district and Uttara Kannada. L-M20 is the single largest male lineage (36.8%) among the Jat people of Northern India and is found at 16.33% among the Gujar's of Jammu and Kashmir. It also occurs at 18.6% among the Konkanastha Brahmins of the Konkan region and at 15% among the Maratha's of Maharashtra. L-M20 is also found at 32.35% in the Vokkaligas and at 17.82% in the Lingayats of Karnataka. L-M20 is also found at 20.7% among the Ambalakarar, 16.7% among the Iyengar and 17.2% among the Iyer castes of Tamil Nadu. L-M11 is found in frequencies of 8-16% among Indian Jews. 2% of Siddis have also been reported with L-M11. Haplogroup L-M20 is currently present in the Indian population at an overall frequency of ca. 7-15%.

Pakistan
The greatest concentration of Haplogroup L-M20 is along the Indus River in Pakistan where the Indus Valley civilization flourished during 3300–1300 BC with its mature period between 2600–1900 BCE. L-M357's highest frequency and diversity is found in the Balochistan province at 28% with a moderate distribution among the general Pakistani population at 11.6% ). It is also found in Afghanistan ethnic counterparts as well, such as with the Pashtuns and Balochis. L-M357 is found frequently among Burusho (approx. 12% ) and Pashtuns (approx. 7% ),

L1a and L1c-M357 are found at 24% among Balochis, L1a and L1c are found at 8% among the Dravidian-speaking Brahui, L1c is found at 25% among Kalash, L1c is found at 15% among Burusho, L1a-M76 and L1b-M317 are found at 2% among the Makranis and L1c is found at 3.6% of Sindhis according to Julie di Cristofaro et al. 2013. L-M20 is found at 17.78% among the Parsis. L3a is found at 23% among the Nuristanis in both Pakistan and Afghanistan.

L-PK3 is found in approximately 23% of Kalash in northwest Pakistan.

Middle East and Anatolia
L-M20 was found in 51% of Syrians from Raqqa, a northern Syrian city whose previous inhabitants were wiped out by Mongol genocides and repopulated in recent times by local Bedouin populations and Chechen war refugees from Russia . In a small sample of Israeli Druze haplogroup L-M20 was found in 7 out of 20 (35%). However, studies done on bigger samples showed that L-M20 averages 5% in Israeli Druze, 8% in Lebanese Druze, and it was not found in a sample of 59 Syrian Druze. Haplogroup L-M20 has been found in 2.0% (1/50)  to 5.25% (48/914) of Lebanese .

Central Asia
A study on the Pashtun male lineages in Afghanistan, found that Haplogroup L-M20, with an overall frequency of 9.5%, is the second most abundant male lineage among them. It exhibits substantial disparity in its distribution on either side of the Hindu Kush range, with 25% of the northern Afghan Pashtuns belonging to this lineage, compared with only 4.8% of males from the south. Specifically, paragroup L3*-M357 accounts for the majority of the L-M20 chromosomes among Afghan Pashtuns in both the north (20.5%) and south (4.1%). An earlier study involving a lesser number of samples had reported that L1c comprises 12.24% of the Afghan Pashtun male lineages. L1c is also found at 7.69% among the Balochs of Afghanistan. However L1a-M76 occurs in a much more higher frequency among the Balochs (20 to 61.54%), and is found at lower levels in Kyrgyz, Tajik, Uzbek and Turkmen populations.

East Asia
Researchers studying samples of Y-DNA from populations of East Asia have rarely tested their samples for any of the mutations that define Haplogroup L. However, mutations for Haplogroup L have been tested and detected in samples of Balinese (13/641 = 2.0% L-M20), Han Chinese (1/57 = 1.8%), Dolgans from Sakha and Taymyr (1/67 = 1.5% L-M20) and Koreans (3/506 = 0.6% L-M20).

Europe
An article by O. Semino et al. published in the journal Science (Volume 290, 10 November 2000) reported the detection of the M11-G mutation, which is one of the mutations that defines Haplogroup L, in approximately 1% to 3% of samples from Georgia, Greece, Hungary, Calabria (Italy), and Andalusia (Spain). The sizes of the samples analyzed in this study were generally quite small, so it is possible that the actual frequency of Haplogroup L-M20 among Mediterranean European populations may be slightly lower or higher than that reported by Semino et al., but there seems to be no study to date that has described more precisely the distribution of Haplogroup L-M20 in Southwest Asia and Europe.

Subclade distribution

L1 (M295)
L-M295 is found from Western Europe to South Asia.

The L1 subclade is also found at low frequencies on the Comoros Islands.

L1a1 (M27)
L-M27 is found in 14.5% of Indians and 15% of Sri Lankans, with a moderate distribution in other populations of Pakistan, southern Iran and Europe, but slightly higher Middle East Arab populations. There is a very minor presence among Siddi's (2%), as well.

L1a2  (M357)
L-M357 is found frequently among Burushos, Kalashas, Jats, and Pashtuns, with a moderate distribution among other populations in Pakistan, Georgia, Chechens, Ingushes, northern Iran, India, the UAE, and Saudi Arabia.

A Chinese study published in 2018 found L-M357/L1307 in 7.8% (5/64) of a sample of Loplik Uyghurs from Qarchugha Village, Lopnur County, Xinjiang.

L-PK3
L-PK3, which is downstream of L-M357, is found frequently among Kalash.

L1b (M317)
L-M317 is found at low frequency in Central Asia, Southwest Asia, and Europe.

In Europe, L-M317 has been found in Northeast Italians (3/67 = 4.5%) and Greeks (1/92 = 1.1%).

In Caucasia, L-M317 has been found in Mountain Jews (2/10 = 20%), Avars (4/42 = 9.5%, 3%), Balkarians (2/38 = 5.3%), Abkhaz (8/162 = 4.9%, 2/58 = 3.4%), Chamalals (1/27 = 3.7%), Abazins (2/88 = 2.3%), Adyghes (3/154 = 1.9%), Chechens (3/165 = 1.8%), Armenians (1/57 = 1.8%), Lezgins (1/81 = 1.2%), and Ossetes (1/132 = 0.76% North Ossetians, 2/230 = 0.9% Iron).

L-M317 has been found in Makranis (2/20 = 10%) in Pakistan, Iranians (3/186 = 1.6%), Pashtuns in Afghanistan
(1/87 = 1.1%), and Uzbeks in Afghanistan (1/127 = 0.79%).

L1b1 (M349)

L-M349 is found in some Crimean Karaites who are Levites. Some of L-M349's branches are found in West Asia, including L-Y31183 in Lebanon, L-Y31184 in Armenia, and L-Y130640 in Iraq. Others are found in Europe, such as L-PAGE116 in Italy, L-FT304386 in Slovenia, and L-FGC36841 in Moldova.

L2 (L595)
L2-L595 is extremely rare, and has been identified by private testing in individuals from Europe and Western Asia.

Two confirmed L2-L595 individuals from Iran were reported in a 2020 study supplementary. Possible but unconfirmed cases of L2 include 4% (1/25) L-M11(xM76, M27, M317, M357) in a sample of Iranians in Kordestan and 2% (2/100) L-M20(xM27, M317, M357) in a sample of Shapsugs, among other rare reported cases of L which don't fall into the common branches.

Ancient DNA
 Three individuals from Maykop culture c. 3200 BCE were found to belong to haplogroup L2-L595.

 Three individuals who lived in the Chalcolithic era (c. 5700–6250 years BP), found in the Areni-1 ("Bird's Eye") cave in the South Caucasus mountains (present-day Vayots Dzor Province, Armenia), were also identified as belonging to haplogroup L1a. One individual's genome indicated that he had red hair and blue eyes.

 Haplogroup L1a-M27 in the remains from a 5th century burial site in Pannonia, Hungary, attributed to an elite member of the Huns.

 Narasimhan et al. (2018) analyzed skeletons from the BMAC sites in Uzbekistan and identified 2 individuals as belonging to haplogroup L1a. One of these specimens was found in Bustan and the other in Sappali Tepe; both ascertained to be Bronze Age sites.

 Skourtanioti et al. (2020) analyzed skeletons from the Alalakh sites in Syria and identified one individual (ALA084) c. 2006-1777 BC as belonging to haplogroup L-L595.

 An ancient Viking individual that lived in Öland, Sweden circa 847 ± 65 CE was determined to belong to L-L595.

Elite Hun grave

 Chalcolithic South Caucasus 

Nomenclature

Prior to 2002, there were in academic literature at least seven naming systems for the Y-Chromosome Phylogenetic tree. This led to considerable confusion. In 2002, the major research groups came together and formed the Y-Chromosome Consortium (YCC). They published a joint paper that created a single new tree that all agreed to use. Later, a group of citizen scientists with an interest in population genetics and genetic genealogy formed a working group to create an amateur tree aiming at being above all timely. The table below brings together all of these works at the point of the landmark 2002 YCC Tree. This allows a researcher reviewing older published literature to quickly move between nomenclatures.

The Y-Chromosome Consortium tree
This is the official scientific tree produced by the Y-Chromosome Consortium (YCC). The last major update was in 2008 . Subsequent updates have been quarterly and biannual. The current version is a revision of the 2010 update.

 Original research publications
The following research teams per their publications were represented in the creation of the YCC Tree.

See also

Footnotes

References

Sources

Journals

 
 
 
 
 
 
 
 
 
 
 
 
 
 
 
 
 
 
 
 
 
 
 
 
 
 
 
 
 
 
 
 
 

Web-sources

Sources for conversion tables
÷
 
 

 
 

 
 

External links

 ISOGG, 
 
 Spread of Haplogroup L, from National Geographic''
 The India Genealogical Project
 Y HAPLOGROUP L

L-M20